Eagles Football Club is an Indian professional football club based in Kochi, Kerala, that competes in the Kerala Premier League.

History
The original Ernakulam Eagles was formed in 1955 in Kochi by a group of football-loving students of St. Albert's High School and NJ Joseph, their mathematics teacher, and an ardent sports-loving businessman.

Varghese Chelatt, then manager of the school, became the first President of the club while Imbayi Mather became secretary.

Ernakulam Eagles were active until the late 1990s, but the professional commitments of its members made the administration of the club difficult. They then folded the club due to those reasons.

The team then announced their second coming in October 2010 as Kochi Eagles Football Club and made it clear that they have great plans to make history in keeping with their lineage. The team is now owned by Ziqitza Sports Management Pvt Ltd.

Eagles F.C. entered into an agreement with Reading F.C. in April 2013 where Reading would send coaches and identify players for training at the Madejski Stadium in Reading. The aim is to identify young talent from Kochi in the age group around 13 and take at least one of the best to play in the Premier League by 2018. Reading officials have assured Eagles FC that if the Eagles enter the first division they would pump money into the club.

Eagles FC Kerala got an entry into Federation Cup 2014 after Langsning FC pulled out of the campaign. Eagles were pitted in Group A against the likes of defending I-League champions Churchill Brothers, runners-up Pune FC and Kolkata-based United SC. The underdogs performed admirably in group stages. Eagles FC drew their match against Pune FC by 1–1 and then defeated United SC by 2 goals to 1. Eventually, Eagles FC Kerala finished second in group stages ahead of Pune FC and United SC.

Home stadium

Honours
Kerala Premier League
Champions (1): 2013–14

References

Association football clubs established in 2010
2010 establishments in Kerala
Football clubs in Kerala
Football clubs in Kochi